Jomo Kenyatta Avenue is a major road in Mombasa, Kenya.

The road travels southeast from Makupa Circus, and terminates at a junction with Digo Road. The crossroads with Ronald Ngala Road and Mwatate Street provides one of Mombasa's two sets of traffic lights (the other being at the west end of the Nyali Bridge).

References 

Streets in Mombasa
Jomo Kenyatta